The Devil Finds Work is a book-length essay by writer James Baldwin. Published in 1976, it is both a memoir of his experiences watching movies and a critique of the racial politics of American cinema.

Synopsis
The book opens with a discussion of a Joan Crawford film, which was the first movie Baldwin could remember seeing, and ends with a discussion of The Exorcist, which came out in 1973. Among the other movies discussed are Guess Who's Coming to Dinner (1967), In the Heat of the Night (1967) and The Defiant Ones (1958).

See also
 African-American representation in Hollywood
 Film criticism

References

1976 non-fiction books
Books by James Baldwin
Books about film
American essays
1976 essays
Dial Press books
Books of film criticism
African-American autobiographies